Márk Kovácsréti (born 1 September 2000) is a Hungarian professional footballer who plays for MTK.

Career statistics
.

References
 
 

2000 births
Living people
Footballers from Budapest
Hungarian footballers
Hungary youth international footballers
Hungary under-21 international footballers
Association football midfielders
Kisvárda FC players
Nyíregyháza Spartacus FC players
MTK Budapest FC players
Nemzeti Bajnokság I players
Nemzeti Bajnokság II players